A pneumatic drill may refer to a:

Jackhammer, a tool used to break up rock and pavement
Drill, run by compressed air